The 1975 West Virginia Mountaineers football team represented West Virginia University in the 1975 NCAA Division I football season.  This was Bobby Bowden's final season as head coach of West Virginia, before moving to Florida State the next season.  West Virginia won the Peach Bowl game against NC State, to finish the season with a record of 9–3. They were ranked 17 in the final Coaches Poll and 20 in the final AP Poll.

Schedule

Roster

References

West Virginia
West Virginia Mountaineers football seasons
Peach Bowl champion seasons
West Virginia Mountaineers football